The Rhein-Ruhr-Marathon is a marathon in Duisburg, which was first held in 1981. It is therefore one of the oldest city marathons in Germany. In addition to the classic 42.195 kilometer race, the current program also incorporates a half marathon, a marathon for inline-skaters and a wheelchair marathon.

History 

When, in  1981, the sport  budget of the City of Duisburg had a sum of 8,000 DM at its disposal, Eintracht Duisburg 1848 audaciously applied for funding for its intention of setting up a marathon. With assistance from sponsors Thyssen Bautechnik, it succeeded in staging the race as a city marathon,  directed in a clockwise fashion through 12 city districts – this was only the second city marathon to be held in Deutschland, after the Frankfurt Marathon which had been run for the first time in the spring of the same year. The then Oberbürgermeister Josef Krings personally fired the starting pistol for this first race on 18 September 1981, in  the  Sportpark Wedau . With 385 competitors making it to the finish, it admittedly lagged behind Frankfurt and the Berlin Marathon of one week later, which each notched up over 3,000 entrants. However the positive response to the first staging of the race lead to Duisburg also being able to report four-figure entrant numbers from 1983 onwards

In 1987 the Deutscher Leichtathletik-Verband conferred its championship on  Duisburg, resulting in a record of  3155 runners reaching the finish line. The administration had by this time however taken on such proportions that the organizing club Eintracht Duisburg was reaching the limits of its capabilities. A decision over the future of the race was postponed when in 1989 Duisburg received the contract for the  Universiade, whose marathon was staged within the framework of the Rhein-Ruhr Marathon. In 1990 however came a (temporary as it turned out) cessation.

In 1991 and 1992 a second attempt was undertaken with  Eintracht Duisburg as organizers  and the  Duisburg Werbe- und Touristik GmbH, a municipal organization, as administrators. Competition with the considerably larger city marathons such as the Berlin Marathon, which was also staged in September, was   however futile and so both organizers and administrators finally pulled out, resulting in the marathon failing to be staged in 1993 and 1994.

In 1995 a new beginning was undertaken by the Stadtsportbund Duisburg e. V. and the Lauf-Club Duisburg e.V., who still administer the race today, and a broader sporting outlook was followed. The direction of the race was altered so that now it went through the town in a counter-clockwise direction and the date was changed from Saturday afternoon to Sunday morning.

In 2000 an  inline-skater event was entered into the program, in 2002 a  half marathon and wheelchair marathon followed. The German Championships of 2000 and 2003 were staged within the framework of the  Rhein-Ruhr Marathon.

Course 

The course consists of a full circuit. The start is in the Kruppstraße in the  Sportpark Wedau, from where it goes through Neudorf to the  city center. While the half-marathon course branches off here in a southern direction towards the Dellviertel, the marathon course leads to the  Inner Harbor and then via Kasslerfeld and the Ruhr as far as Ruhrort. After a diversion through Meiderich it goes over the  Friedrich-Ebert-Bridge taking you to the left bank of the  Rhine (Rhein). From Alt-Homberg it turns South and goes via  Essenberg and Hochemmerich to Rheinhausen. The  Brücke der Solidarität takes it back over the Rhein into  Hochfeld, where at the  28 km mark, it meets the half-marathon course coming in from the North. Shortly after this, the course turns to the South and leads via Wanheimerort, Buchholz and Huckingen as far as its southernmost point and then via  Großenbaum and Wedau to the finish in the  MSV-Arena.

Statistics

Course records 

 Male: 2:14:33, Tibor Baier (Hungary), 1989
 Female: 2:35:09, Irina Bogachova (Soviet Union), 1989

Winners 2008 

Marathon
 Male: Magnus Kreth, 2:33:18
 Female: Marlies Meyer, 2:58:17

Half Marathon
 Male: Boško Bjelajac, 1:13:58
 Female: Lisa Müller, 1:21:27

Finishers 2008 

Number reaching the finish
 Marathon: 1286 (1095 men and 191 women), 71 less than the previous year
 Half Marathon: 2874 (1996 man and 878 women), 625 more than the previous year

List of winners – Marathon 

Sources: website of the organizers, arrs.run

List of winners – Half Marathon

Finishers year by year

See also

 Ruhrmarathon
 List of marathon races in Europe

Footnotes

External links 
 Offizielle Website
 Duisburg-Marathon 1981-92, Website der Eintracht Duisburg, Abteilung Leichtathletik (PDF; 2,45 MB)
 Läuferbericht vom Rhein-Ruhr-Marathon 2008 auf marathon4you.de

Marathons in Germany
Recurring sporting events established in 1981
Sport in Duisburg
Inline speed skating competitions